The following is a list of massacres that have occurred in Slovenia or its territory (numbers may be approximate):

See also
 List of massacres in Yugoslavia

Slovenia
Massacres
 
Massacres